Sinking Spring is a village in Highland County, Ohio, United States. The population was 133 at the 2010 census.

History
A post office called Sinking Spring has been in operation since 1817. The village was named for a losing stream near the original town site.  This city was noted in the 1980s Sesame Street movie Follow That Bird.

Geography
Sinking Spring is located at  (39.074266, -83.387139).

Demographics

2010 census
As of the census of 2010, there were 133 people, 53 households, and 37 families living in the village. The racial makeup of the village was 100.0% White.

There were 53 households, of which 28.3% had children under the age of 18 living with them, 50.9% were married couples living together, 17.0% had a female householder with no husband present, 1.9% had a male householder with no wife present, and 30.2% were non-families. 24.5% of all households were made up of individuals, and 13.2% had someone living alone who was 65 years of age or older. The average household size was 2.51 and the average family size was 3.03.

The median age in the village was 45.2 years. 23.3% of residents were under the age of 18; 7.5% were between the ages of 18 and 24; 18.9% were from 25 to 44; 27.1% were from 45 to 64; and 23.3% were 65 years of age or older. The gender makeup of the village was 49.6% male and 50.4% female.

2000 census
As of the census of 2000, there were 158 people, 57 households, and 44 families living in the village. The population density was 337.6 people per square mile (129.8/km). There were 63 housing units at an average density of 134.6 per square mile (51.8/km). The racial makeup of the village was 97.47% White, 1.90% Native American, and 0.63% from two or more races.

There were 57 households, out of which 45.6% had children under the age of 18 living with them, 61.4% were married couples living together, 12.3% had a female householder with no husband present, and 21.1% were non-families. 17.5% of all households were made up of individuals, and 15.8% had someone living alone who was 65 years of age or older. The average household size was 2.77 and the average family size was 3.04.

In the village, the population was spread out, with 27.8% under the age of 18, 8.9% from 18 to 24, 34.8% from 25 to 44, 15.2% from 45 to 64, and 13.3% who were 65 years of age or older. The median age was 32 years. For every 100 females there were 88.1 males. For every 100 females age 18 and over, there were 83.9 males.

The median income for a household in the village was $38,750, and the median income for a family was $47,500. Males had a median income of $38,333 versus $21,875 for females. The per capita income for the village was $15,089. About 7.7% of families and 7.7% of the population were below the poverty line, including none of those under the age of eighteen and 28.6% of those 65 or over.

Notable person
 Charles Willing Byrd, early Ohio political leader and jurist

Gallery

References

Villages in Highland County, Ohio
Villages in Ohio